Çavuşdere is a village in the Arıcak District of Elazığ Province in Turkey. Its population is 9 (2021). The village is populated by Kurds.

References

Villages in Arıcak District
Kurdish settlements in Elazığ Province